Aleksei Viktorovich Konakh (born 1987) is a Belarusian male badminton player.

Achievements

BWF International Challenge/Series
Men's Doubles

Mixed Doubles

  BWF International Challenge tournament
  BWF International Series tournament
  BWF Future Series tournament

References

External links
 
 

1987 births
Living people
Sportspeople from Brest, Belarus
Belarusian male badminton players
Competitors at the 2013 Maccabiah Games
Maccabiah Games bronze medalists for Belarus
Competitors at the 2017 Maccabiah Games
Maccabiah Games medalists in badminton
Badminton players at the 2019 European Games
European Games competitors for Belarus